Kalmakanda Government Pilot High School (also known as KPHS) is a secondary school in Kalmakanda Upazila under Netrakona District.

History 
Kalmakanda Government Pilot High School was established in 1942 under the British rule before Bangladesh became independent.

Extra curricular activities

Institutional activities 
 Science Fair and Science Lab 
A science fair is organized every year to create a science-conscious society and country. This allows students to identify their own merit by participating spontaneously. Here is sophisticated science for practical classes.
 Computer Lab 
The institute has a computer laboratory to ensure that students are well-versed and to ensure the versatile use of computers. According to the schedule, the class-based students are taught about the use of computer and information technology in their hands.
 Study Tour 
In order to alleviate the fatigue of the classroom, to keep the mind afloat, to know the unknown, to visit the historical and sightseeing of the country with its own initiative, educational tours are organized with the help of leading and leading teachers.
 Library
There are about 4,000 various types of books of essays, novels, short stories, history, geography, mythology, economics, research or discovery, and science.

Developing the Reading Habit Program 
 Debating Club 
Debating Club needs a lot for the students to nice talk and to know and respect the views of others. In addition, a debating club has been set up to know various issues through debate logic and to put into practice the logic of opposition.
 Cultural Club 
Cultural Club is very important for the students' emotional calm and development of their dormant talent. Students can easily become members of the cultural club for a cultural ambiance including dance, song, poetry recitation. Also, the use of various musical instruments, dances, and songs is taught free of cost.
 Sports Club 
The need for a sports club to overcome the monotony of study is immense. Students can develop their talents by participating in various sports including football, cricket, badminton, volleyball, and becoming members of the club. An annual sports competition is also organized to encourage the students.
 Science Club
The main aim of the club is to encourage and inspire students to create science-oriented and innovative new creations. The science fair showcases students' discoveries. In this, the students become more and more focused on the new creation.

References

High schools in Bangladesh
Netrokona District
Schools in Mymensingh Division